Silverton Railway may refer to:

Silverton Railroad in Colorado, United States
Silverton Tramway in New South Wales, Australia